A partial solar eclipse will occur on Monday, August 3, 2054. A solar eclipse occurs when the Moon passes between Earth and the Sun, thereby totally or partly obscuring the image of the Sun for a viewer on Earth. A partial solar eclipse occurs in the polar regions of the Earth when the center of the Moon's shadow misses the Earth. This event will be the 71st and final event of Solar Saros 117.

Related eclipses

Solar eclipses 2054–2058

References

External links 
 NASA graphics

2054 8 3
2054 in science
2054 8 3
2054 8 3